Anopheles earlei is a small insect found throughout North America. The Anopheles earlei larvae are found in cold, clear water in ponds and other small bodies of water that contain plant life or vegetation.

References

  Walter Reed Biosystematic Unit Characteristics, Bionomics, Medical Importance
 GeoSpecies Knowledge Base University of Wisconsin

Insect vectors of human pathogens
Insects described in 1943
earlei